Gregory Tempest (born 28 December 1993) is a Northern Irish professional footballer who plays as a midfielder for Belper Town.

Club career

Notts County
Born in Nottingham, England, Tempest started his career at Notts County when he was sixteen and was featured in the club's first team during pre-season. He signed his first professional contract with the club the following year. Ahead of the 2012–13 season, Tempest was given number twenty-five shirt.

On 9 November 2012, Tempest joined Ilkeston on a month loan and made his debut against United of Manchester. He returned to his parent club after a stint at Ilkeston despite keen of extension.

Upon his return, Tempest made his debut against Scunthorpe United coming on as an 82nd-minute substitute. After making three appearances in his first season, he was offered a new contract by the club, which he signed a two-year contract weeks after being offered.

The 2013–14 season saw Tempest make fourteen appearances for the club under the management of Chris Kiwomya and Shaun Derry. During the season, he provided two assists: one was against Crewe Alexandra, in a 4–0 win on 5 October 2013 and another was against Oldham Athletic on 29 October 2013.

On 26 September 2014, Tempest joined Boston United on loan for a month. He then had his loan at Boston United extended until 27 December 2014. He made his return to his parent club after making fourteen appearances and scoring once against Lowestoft Town for Boston United. Shortly after, Tempest re-joined Boston United for the second time, until the end of the season.

After five years at Notts County, Tempest was released by the club.

Lincoln City
Tempest joined Lincoln City on a one-year contract on 14 May 2015.

Later career
After being released by Lincoln City, Tempest joined Nuneaton Town. On 10 March 2017 he joined Gainsborough Trinity on loan until the end of the 16/17 season.

Tempest joined Basford United in August 2018. He joined Matlock Town on 8 January 2019.

On 23 May 2019, Grantham Town announced the signing of Tempest.

In 2021, Tempest signed for Gedling Miners Welfare.

On 17 June 2022, Tempest joined Belper Town.

International career
Tempest was eligible to play for Northern Ireland through his late grandfather, Bill Corkhill, though he never met his grandfather. In May 2013, Tempest was called up by Northern Ireland U21. He made his Northern Ireland U21 debut on 30 May 2013, in a 3–0 loss against Cyprus U21. His performance in a 1–0 win against Cyprus U21 on 19 November 2013 soon earned him 'Man of the Match'.

Career statistics

References

1993 births
Living people
Footballers from Nottingham
English footballers
English people of Northern Ireland descent
Association footballers from Northern Ireland
Northern Ireland under-21 international footballers
Association football midfielders
Notts County F.C. players
Ilkeston F.C. players
Boston United F.C. players
Lincoln City F.C. players
Nuneaton Borough F.C. players
Gainsborough Trinity F.C. players
Basford United F.C. players
Matlock Town F.C. players
Gedling Miners Welfare F.C. players
Belper Town F.C. players
English Football League players
Northern Premier League players
National League (English football) players
United Counties League players